Ada Palmer Roberts (February 14, 1852 – ?) was an American poet.

Early life
Roberts was born in North East, New York. Her father, Elijah Palmer, was a scholarly lawyer, who had poetical talent. His satirical poems, many of which were impromptu, did much to make him popular as a lawyer. From her father Roberts inherited poetical talent and received most of her early education, as her delicate health would not permit her to be a regular attendant in school. When she was sixteen years old, her education was sufficient for her to teach a private school, her pupils having been her former playmates.

Career
Her poetical productions was not intended for publication, but came from her love of writing. She published but few poems, and some of them found a place in prominent periodicals, the Youth's Companion, the New York Christian Weekly and others.

Personal life
She was married on January 31, 1878, and household duties, maternal cares and recurring ill health kept her from doing regular literary work. She lived in Oxford, Connecticut.

References

External links

1852 births
American poets
American women poets
People from North East, New York
Year of death missing
Wikipedia articles incorporating text from A Woman of the Century